Gloucester Point Grounds is a former baseball ground located in Gloucester City, New Jersey. The ground, roughly bounded by the present day streets: 5th St, Jersey Ave, 7th St, Charles St, and Pine St and then located just behind Thompson's Hotel, along a creek, was the part-time home to the Philadelphia Athletics of the American Association from 1888 to 1890.

References

Defunct baseball venues in the United States
Defunct sports venues in New Jersey
Buildings and structures in Camden County, New Jersey
Gloucester City, New Jersey